OK Cowboy is the debut album of Vitalic, first released in 2005. After a year, the album was re-released featuring a second, enhanced CD.

In 2012 it was awarded a gold certification from the Independent Music Companies Association which indicated sales of at least 75,000 copies throughout Europe.

Inspiration and production

Pascal Arbez said in an interview with MusicRadar that "I was only using a very basic and punk studio setup" for this album. "Polkamatic" was composed as a lullaby for his first son, born during the making of the album. For the track "Repair Machines", he was trying to emulate the style of Chris Korda's vocal sampling. "The Past" was inspired by Jean-Michel Jarre.

Reception

Critical reception to the album was generally positive, with the album receiving a score of 82 at Metacritic. The music review online magazine Pitchfork placed OK Cowboy at number 184 on their list of top 200 albums of the 2000s.

Track listing
"One Billion Dollar Studio" (hidden track, requires manual rewind) – 1:23"Polkamatic" – 1:52
"Poney Part 1" – 5:22
"My Friend Dario" – 3:37
"Wooo" – 3:52
"La Rock 01" – 5:25
"The Past" – 4:27
"No Fun" – 3:36
"Poney Part 2" – 5:12
"Repair Machines" – 3:45
"Newman" – 4:50
"Trahison" – 4:31
"U and I" – 3:39
"Valletta Fanfares" – 2:24

2006 re-release bonus disc
"Repair Machine" (discomix)
"You Are My Sun"
"Suicide Commando"
"Juliet India"
"Bells" (featuring Linda Lamb)
"Warm Leatherette" (live)
"My Friend Dario" (Dima prefers newbeat mix)
"Fanfares"
"Candy"
"One Billion Dollar Studio"

Notes

External links
Vitalic at Citizen Records

2005 debut albums
Vitalic albums